"Machine Gun" is a song by British record production duo Chase & Status, featuring vocals from American rapper Pusha T. It was released on 7 October 2013 as part of the duo's third studio album Brand New Machine (2013). It entered the UK Singles Chart at number 114 and the UK Dance Chart at number 21.

Background and release
Chase & Status cite Pusha as one of the influences for the album and were pleased to get him on a feature. "Machine Gun" premiered via the duo's SoundCloud page on 21 August 2013 and received frequent radio play throughout 2013 on BBC Radio 1Xtra. Digital downloads of the individual track from Brand New Machine caused it to enter the UK Singles Chart at number 114 and the UK Dance Chart at number 21.

Track listing

Personnel
 Will Kennard – producer, mixing
 Saul Milton – producer, mixing
 Terrence "Pusha T" Thornton – vocals

Chart performance

Weekly charts

Release history

References

2013 songs
Chase & Status songs
Pusha T songs
Songs written by Will Kennard
Songs written by Saul Milton
RAM Records singles
Songs written by Pusha T